Boistfort Peak, also called Baw Faw Peak, is a peak in the Willapa Hills in Washington state. The summit was once the site of a fire lookout and is the highest point in the Willapa Hills.
Today it has communication antennae including the WA7UHD 2-meter ham repeater.  It also is the site of station BOW in the Pacific Northwest Seismic Network.

References

External links
 
 

Mountains of Lewis County, Washington
Mountains of Washington (state)